Oxenham is a surname, and may refer to

 Elsie J. Oxenham, British author
 Henry Nutcombe Oxenham, British church historian
 John Oxenham, Elizabethan sea captain and first English person to sail in the Pacific Ocean.
 "John Oxenham", pen name of William Arthur Dunkerley, British poet and journalist
 Justinian Oxenham, Australian public servant
 Ron Oxenham, Australian cricketer
 William Oxenham, British soldier

See also
 Oxenford (disambiguation)
 Oxenford Farm, a noted piece of vernacular and pro-abbatial architecture by the famous Gothic Revivalist Augustus Pugin, located near the A3 road in Surrey.